"I Won't Let the Sun Go Down on Me" is a song by English singer-songwriter Nik Kershaw from his debut studio album, Human Racing (1984). It was his first single, released on 9 September 1983 to limited success. When re-released on 4 June 1984, the song became Kershaw's highest-charting single on the UK Singles Chart, peaking at number two.  It features the non-album track "Dark Glasses" as the B-side, which was also released as a bonus track on the 2012 re-release of the album.

Release
"I Won't Let the Sun Go Down on Me" was originally released on 9 September 1983. After a lack of success, it was then re-released and/or re-promoted in November 1983 with a new sleeve, whereupon it entered the charts. However, despite spending eight weeks in the UK top 100, it only reached number 47. Then, after the top-five success of the follow-up single, "Wouldn't It Be Good", and a further top-20 entry with "Dancing Girls", "I Won't Let the Sun Go Down on Me" was re-released in June 1984 and soared to number two. It was also subsequently a commercial success in several other countries and was responsible for bringing Kershaw to greater public attention.

During an appearance on BBC One's The One Show in June 2015, Pete Waterman of Stock Aitken Waterman claimed he produced the record. Kershaw took to social media to point out that "I Won't Let the Sun Go Down on Me" was in fact produced by Peter Collins, who is credited on all releases as the record's sole producer. (Waterman managed Collins at the time the song was recorded, but had no involvement in the actual production of the track.)

Lyrics
The song was written during the latter part of the Cold War period when nuclear war between the two superpowers of the USSR and United States was still a very real concern, and the lyrics reflect a satirical view of politics and the threat of war with lines such as: "old men in stripey trousers, rule the world with plastic smiles", and: "forefinger on the button, is he blue or is he red?"

In September 1984, Kershaw told Number One magazine:

Musical arrangement
The song was originally written as a folk protest song, but as Kershaw's manager had signed him up to Peter Collins and Pete Waterman's Loose Ends production company, it turned into a pop anthem in the studio.

In Kershaw's version, the synth tune was produced with an Oberheim OB-8 played by Paul "Wix" Wickens.

Music video
There are two different music videos for the song.

First release
The original video for "I Won't Let the Sun Go Down on Me" shows Kershaw singing the song on a hillside and in a castle. He is accompanied by children, and by a minstrel, who plays the guitar parts on a lute. The video was filmed at Allington Castle in Kent.

Second release
When the song was re-released in June 1984, a new video was shot. Because Kershaw was doing promotional work in Europe, there was little time to arrange anything, so a faux live video was shot. It was interspersed with occasional shots of the old men in stripey trousers, including actor Fred Evans. At one point, one of the old men picks a blue rabbit out of a guitar case. This had been sent to Kershaw by a fan named Lauren, and he placed it on stage in front of his right hand monitor during gigs, for luck. Kershaw was not happy with the video, feeling it was hurried:

Track listings

Original release
 7-inch single (MCA 816)
A. "I Won't Let the Sun Go Down on Me" - 3:19
B. "Dark Glasses" (4:15)

 12-inch single (MCAT 816)
A. "I Won't Let the Sun Go Down on Me" (Extended Dance Mix) - 6:00
B. "Dark Glasses" (4:20)

Re-release
 7-inch single (MCA NIK 4)
A. "I Won't Let the Sun Go Down on Me" - 3:19
B. "Dark Glasses" (4:12)

 12-inch single (MCA NIKT 4)
A. "I Won't Let the Sun Go Down on Me" (Extended Remix) - 6:35
B. "Dark Glasses" (4:12)

Charts

Weekly charts

Year-end charts

Robin Cook version

Swedish producer Jonas Ekfeldt recorded his version of the song as Robin Cook in 1996, under the title "I Won't Let the Sun Go Down", which was later included on the album Land of Sunshine (1997). The song charted in Sweden for 19 weeks in 1996, peaking at number three, and in Finland for two weeks, peaking at number 16.

Sampled by Sveriges Radio
Ekfeldt filed a lawsuit against Sveriges Radio for sampling "I Won't Let the Sun Go Down" and accused them for using the sample without permission in the parody "I Won't Let Susan Go Down on Me" on the album Rally 2 from the radio programme Rally on the channel SR P3. Sveriges Radio denied the accusations, but the Swedish National Laboratory of Forensic Science compared the songs and asserted that the former song indeed had been sampled.

The amount of Ekfeldt's compensation was not made public, but was said to be of a significant amount and a lot more than if the channel had asked for permission first.

Track listing
 European CD single
 "I Won't Let the Sun Go Down" (Radio Edit) – 3:05 	
 "I Won't Let the Sun Go Down" (Extended Version) – 4:34 	
 "I Won't Let the Sun Go Down" (Summer Club Mix) – 7:00 	
 "Reggae in the Night" – 3:25

Weekly charts

Year-end charts

References

External links
 

1983 debut singles
1983 songs
1984 singles
1996 singles
MCA Records singles
Nik Kershaw songs
Sampling controversies
Song recordings produced by Peter Collins (record producer)
Songs about nuclear war and weapons
Songs written by Nik Kershaw
Stockholm Records singles